Veanne Cox (born January 19, 1963) is an Emmy and Tony-nominated American stage and screen actress and former ballet dancer.

Early life
Cox was born in Norfolk, Virginia. She is a 1981 graduate of Manchester High School in Chesterfield, Virginia. She studied ballet at the Washington School of Ballet, acting at the Studio Theatre (Washington, D.C.) and voice at Catholic University of America.

Career
Her Broadway debut was in the Marvin Hamlisch musical Smile in 1986 as Sandra-Kay Macaffee. She appeared in the Roundabout Theatre revival of Stephen Sondheim's Company in 1995 as "Amy", for which she received a Tony Award nomination for Featured Actress in a Musical. She appeared in The Public Theater (2003) and the Broadway productions of Caroline, or Change (2004) as Rose Stopnick Gellman.

Cox appeared in the made-for-television movie Cinderella (1997) as one of the stepsisters, and appeared in Erin Brockovich as Theresa Dallavale.

She has appeared in episodes of many television series, such as Seinfeld as Toby (The Fire episode), Blue Bloods in 2016, and Odd Mom Out.

She starred in the Guthrie Theatre production of Private Lives as Amanda in 2007.

Selected stage credits
 An American in Paris — Palace Theatre — 2015
 La Cage aux Folles — Broadway revival — 2010
 The Beaux' Stratagem — The Shakespeare Theatre — 2006
 The Wooden Breeks — Lucille Lortel Theatre — 2006
 Caroline, or Change — Eugene O'Neill Theater – 2004
 House/Garden — Manhattan Theatre Club — 2002 
 The Dinner Party - Music Box Theatre NYC  - 2001 
 The Altruists — Vineyard Theatre — 2000
 Company — Roundabout Theatre — 1995

Filmography

Film

Television

References

External links
 
 
 
 Theatre Mania article, October 27, 2005
 Diva Talk:Playbill June 18, 2004

1963 births
Catholic University of America alumni
American film actresses
American stage actresses
American television actresses
Living people
Actors from Norfolk, Virginia
Actresses from Virginia
20th-century American actresses
21st-century American actresses